The last execution took place in Azerbaijan in 1993 by method of single shot. Capital punishment was abolished in 1998. Protocol No. 6 to the ECHR came into force in this country on the 25th of January 2001 and the death penalty was replaced with life imprisonment.

References
 https://web.archive.org/web/20050324105012/http://www.geocities.com/richard.clark32%40btinternet.com/europe.html

 

Azerbaijan
Law of Azerbaijan
Death in Azerbaijan
Human rights abuses in Azerbaijan
1998 disestablishments in Azerbaijan
2001 disestablishments in Azerbaijan